Orval is a commune in the Cher department in the Centre-Val de Loire region of France.

Geography
The river Cher forms the commune’s eastern border with the town of Saint-Amand-Montrond. Junction 8 of the A71 autoroute is within the commune’s territory and the village is served by a TER train service.

Population

Sights
 The church of St. Hilaire, dating from the twelfth century.
 A sixteenth-century manorhouse at La Tralliere.

See also
Communes of the Cher department

References

External links

Annuaire Mairie website 

Communes of Cher (department)